Cromwell at Windsor Castle is an oil on canvas painting by Eugène Delacroix, executed in 1828, now in the Galerie Hans, a private collection in Hamburg. It shows Oliver Cromwell at Windsor Castle, meditating on a portrait of Charles I.

References

Paintings by Eugène Delacroix
1828 paintings
Cultural depictions of Oliver Cromwell
Charles I of England in art